Taranto-Grottaglie "Marcello Arlotta" Airport  is an airport serving Taranto and Grottaglie, both comunes in the province of Taranto in Italy. It is named for Marcello Arlotta (1886-1918), an Italian aviator.

Overview 
The airport is used for general aviation, with no commercial airline service. As Alenia Aeronautica produces big fuselage parts of the Boeing 787 Dreamliner in a hangar located beside an airport's apron, multiple times a month, a Boeing 747 Large Cargo Freighter, also known as Dreamlifter, lands at Taranto Grottaglie to pick up the parts and fly them to the Boeing factory at Paine Field and Boeing South Carolina at Charleston International Airport for final assembly. Those flights are operated by Atlas Air. It is also known as Taranto-Grottaglie Airport or Grottaglie Airport.
In August 2012, the broker ESAFLY announced that it plans to commence scheduled services from Taranto.

History
In 1923 Grottaglie was a military airfield of Regia Aeronautica
During World War II,  was a military airfield used by Regia Aeronautica and after by the United States Army Air Forces. The airfield was designed for heavy bomber use, and was a major base for Fifteenth Air Force B-24 Liberator heavy bombers used in the strategic bombardment campaign against Germany.   In addition, Twelfth Air Force tactical bombers were stationed at the airfield which were used to support Allied ground forces in the Italian Campaign.

Known USAAF units assigned to the airfield were:
 47th Bombardment Group, 24 Sep-15 Oct 1943, A-20 Havoc  (12 AF)
 321st Bombardment Group, 15 Oct-20 Nov 1943, B-25 Mitchell (12 AF)
 5th Reconnaissance Group, (F-5 (P-38) Lightning), November 1943 - 28 December 1944
 449th Bombardment Group, 4 Jan 1944-16 May 1945, B-24 Liberator (15 AF)
 416th Night Fighter Squadron, 30 Sep 1943-28 Jan 1944, Bristol Beaufighter (12 AF)

Soon after the airport had been seized by the Allies in September 1943, 205th Battery from 89th (Cinque Ports) Heavy Anti-Aircraft Regiment, Royal Artillery, arrived to protect the USAAF build-up.

After the war ended, the airfield was turned over to local authorities, and in 1950 was air base of 86º Gruppo Antisom 8Antisubmarine Warfare Wing) of Italian Air Force
In 1979 was a Naval Air Station of Italian Navy.

Facilities

Spaceport
As of July 2018, there is an announcement of operating the aerodrome as a commercial spaceport.

Accidents and incidents
On Tuesday, October 11, 2022, a Boeing Dreamlifter aircraft (registration N718BA) on its way to Charleston, South Carolina, United States as Atlas Air flight 5Y-4231, lost one of its front wheels after take-off from the airport. The wheel crashed near a highway adjacent to the airport. The flight crew decided to continue their flight and landed safely some 11 hours later at their destination.

Statistics

See also

List of airports in Italy

References

External links

 Official website
 
 

Airports in Apulia
Airfields of the United States Army Air Forces in Italy
Airports established in 1916
Italian airbases